A list of World War I flying aces from the Russian Empire. All aces served in the Imperial Russian Air Force unless otherwise noted.

References
Notes

Bibliography
 
 
 

Wor
Lists of Russian and Soviet military personnel
Russian Empire